Muhurtham Pathinonnu Muppathinu is a 1985 Indian Malayalam film, directed by Joshiy. The film stars Mammootty, Ratheesh, Saritha and Jagathy Sreekumar in the lead roles. The film has musical score by Shyam.

Cast

Mammootty as Haridas
Ratheesh as Jayan
Saritha as Indu
Baby Shalini as Raji
Lalu Alex as Tony
Jagathy Sreekumar as Lazar
V. D. Rajappan as Narayanan
Prathapachandran as Father
Kannur Sreelatha as Reetha
Kunchan as Lonappan
Lalithasree as Sophiyamma
Paravoor Bharathan as Dr. Warrier
Surekha as Dr. Neelima Abraham
P. K. Abraham as Monsignor Kurishingal
KPAC Sunny as Indu's father
Remadevi as Molly

Soundtrack
The music was composed by Shyam and the lyrics were written by Poovachal Khader.

References

External links
 

1985 films
1980s Malayalam-language films
Films directed by Joshiy